Triptychus litosbathron is a species of sea snail, a marine gastropod mollusk in the family Pyramidellidae, the pyrams and their allies.

Description
The shell grows to a length of 2.4 mm.

Distribution
This species occurs in the Atlantic Ocean off Brazil at depths between 45 mm and 175 m.

References

 Pimenta, Santos & Absalao (2008). The Veliger 50 (3) : 171-184|2012-01-12

External links
 To Encyclopedia of Life
 To World Register of Marine Species
 

Pyramidellidae
Gastropods described in 2008